Brandon Harkins (born July 13, 1986) is an American professional golfer who currently plays on the Korn Ferry Tour. Harkins previously played on PGA Tour, PGA Tour Canada and PGA Tour Latinoamérica.

Professional career
Harkins finished tied for 59th at the 2016 U.S. Open.

At the end of 2016, aged 30, Harkins finished 53rd in the Web.com Tour qualifying tournament. This earned him conditional status for the 2017 season.  He finished his first Web.com Tour season in 21st place, and was promoted to the PGA Tour for 2018.

Harkins claimed his first professional victory in November 2021 at the TaylorMade Pebble Beach Invitational. He won by two shots ahead of Alex Čejka and Harry Hall.

In January 2022, Harkins won his first Korn Ferry tour event at The Bahamas Great Abaco Classic. Harkins won in a playoff over Dou Zecheng. This was Harkins' first win in 134 Korn Ferry starts.

Professional wins (2)

Korn Ferry Tour wins (1)

Korn Ferry Tour playoff record (1–0)

Other wins (1)

See also
2017 Web.com Tour Finals graduates

References

External links

American male golfers
PGA Tour Latinoamérica golfers
PGA Tour golfers
Korn Ferry Tour graduates
California State University, Chico alumni
People from Lafayette, California
1986 births
Living people